BRP Sultan Kudarat (PS-22) was a  of the Philippine Navy. In 1961 she was transferred to South Vietnam for service in the Republic of Vietnam Navy as RVNS Đống Đa II (HQ-07). She was acquired by the Philippine Navy on April 1976, and was commissioned later on as RPS Sultan Kudarat (PS-22). Along with other World War II-era ships of the Philippine Navy, Sultan Kudarat was considered one of the oldest active fighting ships in the world, until her retirement in 05 July 2019.

History
Commissioned in the US Navy as USS PCE-895 in 1944, she was renamed USS Crestview (PCE-895) on 15 February 1956, named for the City of Crestview, Florida, "in accordance with a recent Navy decision to name its patrol vessels, previously known only by the hull number, by the names of cities of the United States with populations between 2,500 and 10,000".

She was then transferred to the South Vietnam on 29 November 1961. She served the Republic of Vietnam Navy as RVNS Đống Đa II (HQ-07) up until her escape to the Philippines in 1975, together with other South Vietnamese Navy ships and their respective crew.

She was formally acquired by the Philippine Navy on 5 April 1976 and was commissioned into the Philippine Navy on 27 July 1976 and was renamed RPS Sultan Kudarat (PS-22). She was renamed to BRP Sultan Kudarat (PS-22) in June 1980 using a new localized prefix.

Between 1990 and 1991 the Sultan Kudarat underwent major overhaul, weapons and radar systems refit, and upgrade of communications gear.

She was assigned with the Patrol Force, later on the Offshore Patrol Force of the Philippine Fleet. BRP Sultan Kudarat was decommissioned on July 5, 2019.

In October 2022, the Ship along with the BRP Rajah Humabon (PS-11) and BRP Cebu (PS-28) was seen tilted over and submerged at the Naval Station Pascual Ledesma in Cavite after the onslaught of Severe Tropical Storm Nalgae.

Technical details
There are slight differences between the BRP Sultan Kudarat as compared to some of her sister ships in the Philippine Navy, since her previous configuration was as a patrol craft escort (PCE), while the others are configured as rescue patrol craft escort (PCER) and minesweepers (Admirable class) ships.

Armaments
Originally the ship was armed with one Mk.26 3"/50 caliber dual purpose gun, three single Bofors 40 mm guns, one Hedgehog depth charge projector, four depth charge projectiles (K-guns) and two depth charge tracks. Changes were made during its transfer to the South Vietnamese Navy, as it appears in photos show the removal of her anti-submarine weapons, and addition of four Mk.10 Oerlikon 20 mm guns. This made the ship lighter and ideal for surface patrols, but losing her limited anti-submarine warfare capability. The same configuration applies when she was transferred to the Philippine Navy up until around 1990–1991.

During its overhaul and refit between 1990 and 1991, the Philippine Navy made some changes in the armament set-up. Some sources claim the loss of its three Bofors 40mm cannons during the 1990–1991 overhaul and refit period, but photos as of 2009 show the Bofors guns still present. Final armaments fitted to the ship are one Mk.26 3"/50-caliber gun (fore), three single Bofors 40 mm cannons (aft), four Mk.10 Oerlikon 20 mm cannons (2 each on bridge wings), and four M2 Browning .50 cal (12.7 mm) caliber machine guns (2 besides main bridge, 2 aft near the lower Bofors gun tub).

Electronics
Also during the refit the ship's RCA CRM-NIA-75 surface search radar and RCA SPN-18 navigation radar was replaced by a Raytheon AN/SPS-64(V)11 surface search and navigation radar system. Later modifications included the installation of an additional Furuno navigation radar, long range and satellite communications system and GPS system standard to all Philippine Navy ships.

Machinery
The ship is powered by two GM 12-278A diesel engines, with a combined rating of around  driving two propellers.

Recent photos show that air-conditioning was also installed on the Sultan Kudarat.

References

External links
 Philippine Defense Forum
 Philippine Navy @ Hazegray.org
 DLSU ROTC
 Opus224's Unofficial Philippine Defense Page
 NavSource Online: Patrol Craft Escort Photo Archive

PCE-842-class patrol craft
Ships built in Portland, Oregon
1943 ships
Ships transferred from the United States Navy to the Republic of Vietnam Navy
Vietnam War naval ships of South Vietnam
PCE-842-class patrol craft of the Philippine Navy
Miguel Malvar-class corvettes
Corvettes of the Philippines